Riordan is a surname of Irish origin (Irish: Ó Ríordáin; Old Irish: Ó Ríorghbhardáin); Rearden is a variant of it. 
From ri “king” and bard “poet”, it means “royal poet”. In Irish tradition, the poet was very highly regarded in any royal household, as he acted as scholar, historian and advisor to the king.

People with the name
Ann Fienup-Riordan (born 1948), American cultural anthropologist
Bill Riordan (1908–1973), Australian politician from Queensland; minister for the navy 1946–1949
Daniel J. Riordan (1870–1923), American politician from New York; U.S. representative 1899–1923
Daniel Riordan (born 1984), Irish professional rugby union player
Daniel Riordan (born 1958), American voice actor
Darby Riordan (1888–1936), Australian politician from Queensland; member of the House of Representatives 1929–36
Derek Riordan (born 1983), Scottish professional football player
Fergus Riordan (born 1997), Spanish actor
Hugh D. Riordan (1932-2005), American psychiatrist and medical researcher
James Riordan (1936–2012), English novelist, broadcaster, sports historian, association football player and Russian scholar
Joe Riordan (born 1930), Australian politician and government minister
John Riordan (banker), American banker who rescued 105 South Vietnamese
John Riordan (mathematician) (1903–1988), American mathematician and author
Linda Riordan (born 1953), British politician; MP from Halifax since 2005
Maurice Riordan (born 1953), Irish poet, translator, and editor
Michael H. Riordan (born 1951), American economics professor
Michael L. Riordan (born 1957), the founder and CEO/Chairman (1987-1997) of biotechnology company Gilead Sciences
Mike Riordan (basketball) (born 1945), American professional basketball player
Pat Riordan (born 1979), Canadian rugby union player
Patrick William Riordan (1841–1914), American Roman Catholic archbishop
Paul F. Riordan (1920–1944), American army officer; recipient of the Medal of Honor
Richard Riordan (born 1930), American politician from California; mayor of Los Angeles 1993–2001
Richard Riordan (Australian politician) (born 1972), Australian politician
Rick Riordan (born 1964), American author
Steva Riordan (1876-after 1908), Irish hurler
Terry Riordan (born 1973), American professional lacrosse player
Tim Riordan (born 1960), American football player
William F. Riordan (1941–2020), Justice of the New Mexico Supreme Court

Fictional characters
Dallas Riordan, character in the Marvel Comics universe.
Nita Riordan, character in Louis L'Amour's Kilkenny books.
The Riordans, a 1960s–70s soap opera on RTÉ (Irish television)

See also
O'Riordan, a surname

Surnames of Irish origin